Dumbarton Bridge may refer to:

 Dumbarton Bridge (California)
 Dumbarton Bridge (Washington, D.C.)
 Old Dumbarton Bridge, built in 1765 in Dumbarton, Scotland